The 2015–16 season was Arsenal's 24th season in the Premier League and 97th consecutive season in the top flight of English football. The club entered the season as the FA Cup holders, and participated in the Premier League, FA Cup, League Cup, Community Shield and the UEFA Champions League. Arsenal were favourites to get their first league title since 2004, having been league-leaders towards the New Year, but a loss of form which included successive defeats to Manchester United and Swansea City saw them lose ground on eventual winners Leicester City, although they recovered to get 2nd, their highest finish in 11 years. Arsenal's attempt of winning a third consecutive FA Cup was unsuccessful, losing to Watford at the quarter-final stage, as well as exiting in the League Cup fourth round to Sheffield Wednesday. In Europe, Arsenal recovered from a poor start to qualify for the knockout-stages, but they were defeated in both legs against Barcelona. The season covers the period from 1 July 2015 to 30 June 2016.

Review

August

Arsenal began their season with the Community Shield against local rival side Chelsea. The Gunners won the match 1–0, following a goal by Alex Oxlade-Chamberlain, who scored via a drive into the top corner. The trophy was Arsène Wenger's 15th in 18 years of being in charge of Arsenal, and presented Wenger with his first win against a side managed by José Mourinho after 13 attempts. Soon after, Arsenal began their 24th Premier League season at home to West Ham United, and inspired by the signing of goalkeeper Petr Čech, many believed Arsenal to be title contenders for the first time in 11 years. The club's solid pre-season form, however, fizzled out as they failed to win in their first two home games, with a 2–0 defeat to West Ham on the opening weekend, leaving them third-bottom, and a goalless draw with Liverpool, although Aaron Ramsey was falsely ruled offside for an early goal. With two tight wins at Crystal Palace and Newcastle United, Arsenal went into September with seven points. Arsenal did not make additional signings after Čech, leaving manager Wenger to come under fire from fans and critics.

September

Arsenal started September with a nervy 2–0 win over Stoke City at the Emirates, with Theo Walcott and Olivier Giroud scoring. Between the Stoke clash and a trip to struggling champions Chelsea, Arsenal faced Dinamo Zagreb away in the Champions League. Despite appearing the stronger side, Arsenal slumped to a shock 2–1 defeat, with under-performing striker Giroud being sent off for two yellow cards. The week got worse as Arsenal lost 2–0 at Stamford Bridge, with Santi Cazorla (two yellows) and Gabriel being sent off, the latter incorrectly shown red by Mike Dean for a clash with Diego Costa in which the latter assaulted Laurent Koscielny. Gabriel's ban was reduced from three games to one, but Gabriel, Costa, Chelsea and Arsenal were all fined for player misconduct, with Costa suspended for three games. With the Chelsea incident resolved, Arsenal faced a tough League Cup tie with North London arch-rival club Tottenham Hotspur at White Hart Lane. Mathieu Flamini became an unsung hero with a brace, the second of which was a volley from 20 yards, both goals on the other side of a Calum Chambers own goal. Arsenal, full of confidence after eliminating their rivals, visited the only unbeaten team in the league at the time, Leicester City, who were one point and one place above Arsenal. Despite a brace from Jamie Vardy, Walcott and Giroud scored either side of three goals from Sánchez, who ended a run of seven games without a goal. Arsenal ended their month on a sour note, however, as errors from second-choice goalkeeper David Ospina saw Arsenal lose 3–2 to Olympiacos at home in the Champions League, meaning they were bottom of their group with successive games against in-form Bayern Munich coming up.

October

Arsenal started October on a high, as three early goals—two from Alexis Sánchez and one from Mesut Özil—at the Emirates saw Arsenal breeze past Manchester United to leapfrog them into second place in the league table, behind Manchester City. Arsenal travelled to Vicarage Road two weeks later to play Watford, where goals from Sánchez, Aaron Ramsey and Olivier Giroud saw Arsenal claim another 3–0 win. Arsenal hosted German heavyweights Bayern Munich in an attempt to turn around their Champions League. Despite the German team losing only once all season, Arsenal claimed a shock 2–0 win, with Giroud and Özil scoring late in the second half. Giroud's return to form saw him return to the starting lineup ahead of Theo Walcott. Giroud thanked Wenger by inspiring the Gunners to a 2–1 win over Everton at the Emirates. Arsenal's only loss in October came between the Everton win and a 3–0 victory over Swansea City, courtesy of goals from Giroud, Laurent Koscielny and Joel Campbell, when they were stunned by Championship side Sheffield Wednesday, going out of the League Cup in a 3–0 defeat that saw Theo Walcott and Alex Oxlade-Chamberlain off injured, with goals from Ross Wallace, Lucas João and Sam Hutchinson.

November
Arsenal were humiliated at the Allianz Arena to start November, with Bayern Munich cruising to a 5–1 win, putting Arsenal's Champions League progression in doubt. Arsenal hosted rivals Tottenham on the Sunday that followed, but with stars Héctor Bellerín, Theo Walcott, Aaron Ramsey and Alex Oxlade-Chamberlain on a list of ten injured Arsenal players, the Gunners had to struggle for a 1–1 draw. November only got worse for Arsenal, with Francis Coquelin looking at three months out, Mikel Arteta facing several weeks out after both were injured in a 2–1 defeat at West Bromwich Albion, with Santi Cazorla missing a vital penalty late on. Arsenal's Champions League form bounced back, with an Alexis Sánchez brace giving Arsenal a 3–0 win over Dinamo Zagreb at the Emirates. With Olympiacos thrashed by Bayern, Arsenal would need a two-goal cushion or a 3–2 or higher victory in Athens to progress. Arsenal's horrid month ended with more misery, with Sánchez and Cazorla both suffering injuries in a 1–1 draw with Norwich City, with Cazorla's keeping him out for three months. Oxlade-Chamberlain, Ramsey and Walcott, however, all returned at the end of the month, with the crucial Olympiacos game and a match with Premier League title contenders Manchester City coming up.

December
Arsenal returned to form in December, starting with a 3–1 win over Sunderland, with Joel Campbell and Aaron Ramsey scoring either side of goals at either end from Olivier Giroud. Arsenal then traveled to Olympiacos, where they had failed to win in their last three games, with their last win in Greece coming in 1998. Fears were erased by a Giroud hat-trick, putting Arsenal through and demoting Olympiacos into the Europa League, only for Arsenal to draw holders Barcelona, who had knocked Arsenal out in the 2010 quarter finals and in 2011 at the same stage. The Spanish side also beat the Gunners in the 2006 final. Arsenal recorded successive victories before Christmas, winning 2–0 at Aston Villa, before a 2–1 home win over Manchester City. As things were looking up, a Boxing Day defeat at Liverpool saw surprise leaders Leicester loosen their grip on first, giving Arsenal a chance to go top with a win against Southampton, but a Shane Long brace saw Arsenal thrashed 4–0. Despite this, Arsenal still finished 2015 top of the Premier League, after a 2–0 win against AFC Bournemouth was enough to keep Arsenal ahead of Leicester on goal difference, who drew 0–0 with Manchester City in their final game of 2015.

January

Arsenal started 2016 with an unconvincing 1–0 win over relegation scrappers Newcastle, courtesy of a late Laurent Koscielny goal. Arsenal kicked off their FA Cup defence against Sunderland at the Emirates. Their 3–1 win mirrored the clash in December, with Joel Campbell, Olivier Giroud and Aaron Ramsey scoring Arsenal's goals in identical fashion to the league tie, despite an early Jeremain Lens goal. This was followed by two away league fixtures at Liverpool and Stoke; the former was a 3–3 draw with Giroud scoring a brace and Ramsey finding the net for Arsenal, whereas the latter finished scoreless. On 24 January, Arsenal hosted local rivals Chelsea and were defeated 1–0 after Per Mertesacker was sent off. This meant they had failed to win a league game against Chelsea for the ninth league meeting in a row, and it was the sixth consecutive time they had failed to score in the fixture. Six days later, Arsenal advanced to the fifth round of the FA Cup, with Calum Chambers and Alexis Sánchez scoring in a 2–1 defeat of Championship side Burnley at home. Arsenal made one signing in January, Basel's Egyptian midfielder Mohamed Elneny completed a £5 million move.

February 

In the beginning of February, Arsenal failed to score for the third consecutive league match, playing Southampton to a stalemate at the Emirates. Mesut Özil and Alex Oxlade-Chamberlain led Arsenal back to winning ways with a 2–0 away victory at AFC Bournemouth. Arsenal then won a dramatic top of the table clash with league leaders Leicester, coming back after a Jamie Vardy penalty to win 2–1 at home, with late goals from Theo Walcott and Danny Welbeck, reducing the gap between Arsenal and Leicester in second and first to two points. Despite a dominant performance at home, Arsenal were held to a 0–0 draw by Hull City in the fifth round of the FA Cup. Arsenal subsequently returned to Champions League action by hosting title holders Barcelona. A Lionel Messi brace condemned Arsenal to a 2–0 defeat. Arsenal ended February with an away game at Manchester United, with goals from Welbeck and Özil not enough to avoid a 3–2 defeat.

March 
Arsenal started March suffering a third consecutive loss at the hands of Swansea at home; Joel Campbell's goal was cancelled out and the match finished 2–1 to Swansea. Arsenal then visited local rivals Tottenham in a make-or-break clash, as defeat would put Arsenal six points off their rivals, above Arsenal in second. Aaron Ramsey gave Arsenal a crucial lead, but a Francis Coquelin sending off for two yellow cards turned the game on its head. Toby Alderweireld and Harry Kane struck back to put Spurs ahead, but Alexis Sánchez helped the team rescue a point with a late goal, with the match finishing 2–2. Olivier Giroud and Theo Walcott scored two goals each against Hull City in the FA Cup fifth round replay to reach the quarter finals, but Arsenal went out after a 2–1 home defeat to Watford, with Danny Welbeck scoring the lone goal for the team as Arsenal's defence ended, after winning the previous two titles. Arsenal went out of their second cup competition just days later, being condemned a sixth-straight last-16 elimination from the Champions League with a 3–1 away loss to Barcelona, Mohamed Elneny's first Arsenal goal proving a mere consolation. One promising note from the defeat was the performance of Nigerian youngster Alex Iwobi, and he was rewarded with his second Premier League start against Everton at the end of March. His first club goal, and a fourth goal in nine games since return for Danny Welbeck, saw Arsenal win 2–0.

April
Arsenal got off to a flying start in the penultimate month of the season; goals from Alexis Sánchez, Héctor Bellerín and Theo Walcott, as well as a second Premier League goal on a second start for Alex Iwobi, saw Arsenal crush Watford 4–0 at Emirates Stadium. The result kept Arsenal firmly in the title race ahead of a crucial clash at sixth-placed West Ham the following weekend, having lost the reverse tie on opening day. The result saw praise for Iwobi, who was referred to as "the next Ian Wright" by Garth Crooks. Arsenal visited West Ham the following matchday, where they blew away a 2–0 lead to draw 3–3. Sánchez, Özil and Koscielny scored. Arsenal's title hopes suffered a big blow when they were held 1–1 at home by Crystal Palace despite dominating the match, with Sánchez scoring for the team. Arsenal hosted and defeated West Brom 2–0, courtesy of a brace from Sánchez. Arsenal's chances of ending a 12-year Premier League title drought became mathematically impossible after a 0–0 away draw at Sunderland, which left them 12 points behind leaders Leicester with only three matches to play. Arsenal ended April with a 1–0 win over Norwich at Emirates Stadium, with Danny Welbeck scoring the solitary goal.

May 
After Manchester City were defeated by Southampton, Arsenal stayed in third ahead of a clash with fourth placed City. Arsenal came from behind twice to recover a 2–2 draw. Olivier Giroud ended a 15-game goal drought dating back to January with the first, while Alexis Sánchez added his seventh goal in nine games for Arsenal's second. The draw failed to secure Champions League football for 2016–17, but after Manchester United lost 3–2 to West Ham two days later secured at least a place in the qualification round. Arsenal needed a point against Aston Villa to secure automatic qualification and third place. Arsenal would have to hope a win and a shock victory by already-relegated Newcastle against Tottenham for Arsenal to pip their rivals to second. Newcastle did the impossible with a 5–1 rout of Spurs, and an Olivier Giroud hat-trick powered Arsenal to a 4–0 win over Villa. Captain Mikel Arteta, who came on as a substitute in what was his final appearance before retirement, forced an own goal by shooting in off the bar and Villa goalkeeper Mark Bunn. Arteta was given a standing ovation, while second-longest-serving player Tomáš Rosický received a guard of honour, with the club confirming both would leave at the expiration of their contracts.

Players

Squad information

Transfers

Transfers in

Total spending:   Undisclosed (~ £21,521,000)

Transfers out

Total incoming:   Undisclosed (~ £1,800,000)

Loans out

Overall transfer activity

Spending

Summer:  Undisclosed (~ £14,121,000)

Winter:  Undisclosed (~ £7,400,000)

Total:  Undisclosed (~ £21,521,000)

Income

Summer:  Undisclosed  (~ £1,800,000)

Winter:  Undisclosed  (~ £0,000,000)

Total:  Undisclosed  (~ £1,800,000)

Net expenditure

Summer:  Undisclosed  (~ £13,321,000)

Winter:  Undisclosed  (~ £7,400,000)

Total:  Undisclosed  (~ £20,721,000)

Club

Coaching staff

Kit
Supplier: Puma / Sponsor: Fly Emirates

Kit information
This is Puma's second year supplying Arsenal kit, having taken over from Nike at the beginning of the 2014–15 season.

Home: The home kit features Arsenal's traditional colours of red and white. The kit features red trim on the sleeves and a grandad collar. Additionally, golden trim features on the kit for the first time since 2006–07. The traditional white socks are returned to the kit after the club played in hooped socks last season.
Away: The away kit features the colours gold and navy, and is similar to the away kit worn in the Double-winning 2001–02 season. The shirt has navy shoulders and a crew-neck, but the most striking feature of the kit is the subtle diamond graphic on the body of the shirt. The strip is combined with navy shorts and socks.
Third: The third kit, which is set to be used in cup competitions, is mainly anthracite with white, gold and 'Capri Breeze' (turquoise) diagonal sashes. The kit features a monochromatic golden Arsenal badge and is combined with anthracite shorts and socks. Turquoise shorts and socks were worn in the match against Sheffield Wednesday.
Keeper: The goalkeeper kits are based in Puma new goalkeeper template utilised by the supplier's top clubs, which feature contrasting hoops on the top half of the body. The first-choice strip is dark grey with golden hoops and a lighter grey stripe on the sleeves, while the second-choice strip is aqua with black hoops and golden detailing. The alternative strip is orange and also features black hoops.

Other information

Squad statistics

Appearances and goals

Numbers in parentheses denote appearances as substitute. Players with number struck through and marked  left the club during the playing season.

Source: Arsenal F.C. and 11v11.com

Top scorers

Source: Arsenal F.C. and 11v11.com

Disciplinary record

Source: 11v11.com

Clean sheets

Source: 11v11.com (Petr Čech) and 11v11.com (David Ospina)

Pre-season 

Arsenal started the 2015–16 season retaining Puma as their kit supplier and Emirates as their shirt sponsor. In July, they went on a preseason tour to Asia. During this, they participated in the Premier League Asia Trophy in Singapore along with fellow Premier League sides Everton and Stoke City as well as a Singapore Selection XI. Following this tournament, Arsenal will then play in their traditional yearly Emirates Cup tournament at the Emirates Stadium, with Lyon, Villarreal and VfL Wolfsburg also participating. The match against Wolfsburg marked the return of former Arsenal striker Nicklas Bendtner, who made his first return to the Emirates Stadium with Wolfsburg.

Pre-season matches

Competitions

Overall

Overview

{| class="wikitable" style="text-align: center"
|-
!rowspan=2|Competition
!colspan=8|Record
|-
!
!
!
!
!
!
!
!
|-
| Premier League

|-
| FA Community Shield

|-
| FA Cup

|-
| League Cup

|-
| Champions League

|-
! Total

FA Community Shield

Premier League

League table

Results summary

Results by matchday

Matches
On 17 June 2015, the fixtures for the forthcoming season were announced.

FA Cup

League Cup

UEFA Champions League

Arsenal qualified for the group stage of the 2015–16 UEFA Champions League due to finishing third in the 2014–15 Premier League. This means that Arsenal have qualified for the UEFA Champions League for the 18th consecutive year. Following changes to UEFA qualification rules, pot 1 for group stage draws would now consist of the Champions League holders and the champions of the seven highest ranked associations. Arsenal having previously been seeded in pot 1 for the Champions League draw as one of the top 8 ranked teams in UEFA, dropped into pot 2 for the 2015–16 UEFA Champions League group stage draw with the remainder of the highest seeded non-champions according to UEFA coefficient.

Group stage

Knockout phase

The draw for the round of 16 was held on 14 December 2015. The first leg was played on 23 February, and the second leg was played on 16 March 2016.

Round of 16

Awards

Arsenal Player of the Month award

Awarded monthly to the player chosen by fan voting on Arsenal.com

References

Arsenal
Arsenal F.C. seasons
Arsenal F.C.